Moonlight Sonata  is the 2nd EP and the final release from American progressive metal band The Human Abstract.  The EP was released on February 14, 2012, and is a cover of all three parts of Ludwig van Beethoven's "Moonlight Sonata".

Production 
Guitars for the album were recorded by Dean Herrera with production from Will Putney.

Critical reception 
The ensemble likens the song to “Dean Shreds Beethoven” while Axl Rosenberg of MetalSucks describes the albums as "the best two bucks you'll ever spend today".  Rosenberg goes on to say that the band added heavy metal to the song, and that the song purports that there exists "distinct and definite connection between classical music and metal".

Track listing

Personnel 
The Human Abstract
Dean Herrera – guitars
Brett Powell - drums
Henry Selva - bass

Production
Will Putney

References

External links 
 

2012 EPs
The Human Abstract (band) albums
Albums produced by Will Putney